The Lancia Chivasso Plant was the second manufacturing plant of Italian automobile company Lancia, following the Lancia Borgo San Paolo Plant.  The plant manufactured Lancia models such as the Lancia Flaminia, Lancia Beta, Lancia Delta, Lancia Prisma and others.

History 
On December 20, 1959, the Minister of Foreign Affairs Giuseppe laid the foundation stone of the new large 1,120,000 m2 factory, for the Italian car brand Lancia, which at that time was under the control of the family Pesenti. In 1972 the number of workers in the Chivasso increased to 5,000.

The plant started production of Lancia cars, which were built on a Fiat platform. After 1993, the plant began production of Fiat models such as Fiat Panda Van and Fiat Barchetta under the auspices of Maggiora, until its bankruptcy in the early 2000s. Since then, the plant has been converted into a business park.

List of cars produced 
1963 - 1969 Lancia Flaminia
1963 - 1970 Lancia Flavia
1963 - 1976 Lancia Fulvia
1972 - 1984 Lancia Beta
1976 - 1984 Lancia Gamma
1980 - 1994 Lancia Delta
1982 - 1989 Lancia Prisma
1989 - 1993 Lancia Dedra
1995 - 2002 Fiat Barchetta
1997 - 2002 Fiat Panda Van
1997 - 2001 Lancia K Coupé

References 

Motor vehicle assembly plants in Italy
Lancia
Fiat Group factories